is the name of an area in central Niigata Prefecture. The word chūetsu is an abbreviation for central Echigo Province.

It is an important rice-growing region. Koshihikari which had been grown in this region is highly prized in Japan.

In common with much of Hokuriku region, the region experiences heavy snowfall during winter, and many ski resorts dot the mountainous areas. 

The main cities in the region include Nagaoka and Uonuma

The October 23 2004 Chūetsu earthquake, centred on Ojiya, killed 67 people in the region. The magnitude 6.8 quake caused the first ever derailment of a shinkansen.

Geography

Terrain 

 Mountains: Mount Naeba, Mount Hakkaisan, Mount Echigo-Komagatake, Mount Makihatayama, Mount Yoneyama, Mount Sumondake, Mount Yahiko
 Rivers: Shinano River, Uono River, Shibukai River
 Mountain Range:  Echigo Mountains
 Hills: Uonuma Hills, Tokubiki Hills
 Hot springs: Yudami hot spring , Hodaira hot spring , Muikamachi hot spring , Echigo Yuzawa hot spring , Matsunoyama hot spring

Geography of Niigata Prefecture